"Closer" is a song by American DJ duo The Chainsmokers featuring American singer Halsey. Andrew Taggart (one half of the Chainsmokers) also provides his vocals in the song. It was released on July 29, 2016, through Disruptor Records and Columbia Records. The song was written by Taggart, Halsey, Shaun Frank, Freddy Kennett, Isaac Slade and Joe King, while the production was handled by the Chainsmokers. Musically, it is a future bass and pop song with a "retro" style synthesizer in the chorus.

In the United States, "Closer" became both the Chainsmokers' and Halsey's first number one single on the Billboard Hot 100. The song stayed at the top spot for 12 consecutive weeks. This is the highest EDM song that cracked the Billboard Decade-End in the 2010s according to Billboard. The Chainsmokers became the first act to have four songs ("Closer" being the fourth) that top the Dance/Electronic Songs chart, passing Calvin Harris, who held the previous record with three. Internationally the single topped the charts in seventeen countries including Australia, Canada, New Zealand, Ireland, and the United Kingdom, making it both the Chainsmokers' and Halsey's first chart-topping song in all six countries. The song went on to become the first song to spend 26 weeks in the top five of the Billboard Hot 100 chart. It also became the second song in the history of the Hot 100 chart to spend 32 weeks in the top ten of the chart.

The song was performed live for the first time at the Coachella Valley Music and Arts Festival in April 2016. Halsey and the Chainsmokers performed the track live at the 2016 MTV Video Music Awards as well as a remix of the song at the 2016 American Music Awards. Its music video was released on October 23, 2016. It received a nomination for Best Pop Duo/Group Performance at the 2017 Grammy Awards.

In 2018, the song received a diamond certification by the RIAA for selling 10 million units in the United States.

Background and release
The song's beat was created in a session between Chainsmokers member Andrew Taggart and Freddy Kennett of Louis the Child. Taggart wrote the song with Canadian DJ Shaun Frank in one session, and Frank encouraged him to sing on the song. According to Taggart, the track was inspired by the Blink-182 song "I Miss You", which the duo were listening to on repeat and is referenced in the song. He later said the song instead was "Feeling This", though he could not really remember which:  "I've listened to their self-titled album so many times the whole thing is pretty much beat," he tweeted. The band Taking Back Sunday also influenced the song. The song is about a couple who broke up and unexpectedly meet long after, leading to romantic attraction again. Before Halsey was brought on as the female vocalist, the collaboration was originally supposed to feature former Fifth Harmony member Camila Cabello. After comparisons were drawn between "Closer" and The Fray's "Over My Head (Cable Car)", lead singer Isaac Slade and guitarist Joe King of The Fray were credited as co-writers of "Closer" on September 2, 2016. The song was released on July 29, 2016, through Disruptor Records and Columbia Records. Genius pointed out the similarity between "Closer" and Fetty Wap's "679" in September 2016, claiming that the songs' choruses are nearly identical, with the only major difference being that Fetty's is in D major and The Chainsmokers' is in A-flat major. Genius even cut together a video of the choruses playing over each other.

Composition
The song is written in the key of A-flat major with a common time tempo of 95 beats per minute and a chord progression of D(9)–E–Fm–E. The vocals span from E to B.

Critical reception
Matt Medved of Billboard wrote the song "sounds like an instant classic," stating that it "[boasts] an earworm chorus and evocative verses like 'play that Blink-182 song that we beat to death in Tucson,' (one of Halsey's few solo verses), "Closer" captures the millennial zeitgeist in brilliantly infectious fashion." MTV journalist Deepa Lakshmin called the song "an upbeat, dance-worthy jam that deserves a spot on your summer playlist. It'll make you forget about all your pesky life problems and live in the moment." The song received a more mixed review from Idolator, with a consensus from various editors resulting in a 5/10 rating. While reviewing Halsey's 2021 album If I Can't Have Love, I Want Power, Dani Blum of Pitchfork described their "Auto-Tuned" part of the song as the "ache [...] that threatened to define their career."

Billboard ranked "Closer" at number 29 on their "100 Best Pop Songs of 2016" list: "The year's longest-running No. 1 on the Hot 100 was as predictable a smash as they come: Perfectly played duet drama, an immediately recognizable hook – maybe a little too instantly recognizable – and a Blink-182 reference that made every Millennial listening nod with begrudging respect. Overplay might've done The Chainsmokers and Halsey a temporary disservice, but just wait for the emotional rush that hits in 2025 when you're hanging in a hotel bar and hear this for the first time in years."

Commercial performance

"Closer" debuted at number nine on the Billboard Hot 100 in the issue dated August 20, 2016. It became the third top ten single for the Chainsmokers on the chart, after "Roses" and "Don't Let Me Down". It is Halsey's first top ten on the chart and their second top forty. In the issue dated September 3, 2016, the song moved from number six to one, becoming both artists' first number-one song and the first song by a duo to top the chart since Macklemore & Ryan Lewis' "Thrift Shop" and "Can't Hold Us" in 2013. It is also the first song titled "Closer" to reach number one (Ne-Yo's song of the same name reached number 7 in 2008). Moreover, the song also topped the Dance/Electronic Songs chart, becoming the first song to reach number one on both the Hot 100 and the Dance/Electronic chart simultaneously since Baauer's "Harlem Shake" in early 2013. It became the duo's fourth number one song to top the latter chart, passing Calvin Harris' previous record of three songs. It went on to top the Hot 100 chart for twelve consecutive weeks.

On the issue date November 5, 2016, "Closer" became the 33rd song to top the chart for at least 10 weeks. By spending an 11th week atop the chart, it became the longest number one single of 2016 surpassing Drake's "One Dance" which spent 10 non-consecutive weeks at number one. In its fourth week, the song was joined by Twenty One Pilots' "Heathens", which moved from number three to number two. This marks the first time (and the third time overall) that duos have held the top two spots at the same time since June 1985, when Tears for Fears was on top with "Everybody Wants to Rule the World" and Wham! was number two with "Everything She Wants." (The week before, the two songs were in the opposite order.) On the chart issue dated November 26, 2016, the song was ousted from number one by "Black Beatles" by Rae Sremmurd featuring Gucci Mane. On the issue dated January 28, 2017, "Closer" surpassed Justin Bieber's "Love Yourself" for the most weeks logged in the top 10 from a song's debut, having totaled all 32 of its weeks on the chart in the region since its debut on the issue dated 20 August 2016.

On the issue dated March 11, 2017, "Closer" became the 4th song to stay in the top ten for 30 weeks. Only Leann Rimes' "How Do I Live", Santana's 1999 single "Smooth" (feat. Rob Thomas) and Mark Ronson's "Uptown Funk" (feat. Bruno Mars) have achieved this feat since the Billboard Hot 100 was formed in 1958. On the issue dated March 25, 2017, "Closer" spent its 32nd week in the top ten, tying LeAnn Rimes' all-time record with "How Do I Live", before finally dropping out the following week. The record was broken later that year by Ed Sheeran's "Shape of You", which spent 33 consecutive weeks in the top ten. The song's long run within the top 10 caused it to place at number 7 on Billboard's 2017 year-end chart after placing at number 10 the previous year, making "Closer" one of only four songs in the history of the chart to be ranked on the top ten of two separate Hot 100 year-end charts, along with Chubby Checker's "The Twist" (#10 in 1960 and #9 in 1962), Elton John's "Candle in the Wind 1997" (#1 in 1997 and #8 in 1998), and LeAnn Rimes' "How Do I Live" (#9 in 1997 and #5 in 1998).

"Closer" achieved its 12th week atop Digital Songs with 84,000 downloads sold in the week ending October 27, according to Nielsen Music; the total is the lowest for a number one song on the tally in 10 years. The track became the third best-selling song of the year, behind Flo Rida's "My House" and Justin Timberlake's "Can't Stop the Feeling!".

Internationally, the song reached number one in Australia on August 13, 2016, also becoming both the Chainsmokers' and Halsey's first number-one song there. It also peaked at number one in the UK, New Zealand and Canada. The song topped the UK Singles Chart for four weeks, becoming the first song by a duo to log multiple weeks at number one in both the US and the UK since LMFAO's "Party Rock Anthem" in 2011.

"Closer" is currently the sixth most streamed song on Spotify, behind "Shape of You", "Blinding Lights" by The Weeknd, "Dance Monkey" by Tones and I, "Rockstar" by Post Malone, and "One Dance" by Drake. On May 19, 2017, it became only the second song to achieve 1 billion streams on the streaming platform. In April 2021, "Closer" surpassed 2 billion streams on Spotify, making it the sixth song to do so.

Lyric video
The lyric video for "Closer" was edited and directed by Rory Kramer, and features Alyssa Lynch and Jordan Wright. It received one billion views on January 10, 2017, and two billion views on February 4, 2018, making it the first lyric video ever to reach these milestones, and by September, 2021, it is the 30th most-viewed video of all time, as well as the most viewed lyric video with over 2.8 billion views on YouTube.

Music video

The music video for "Closer", directed by Dano Cerny, was released on October 24, 2016. The video begins with the Chainsmokers' Andrew Taggart looking at Halsey while at a party. It then flashes back to an earlier time where Taggart and Halsey's characters met for the first time in a party, where they eventually ended up kissing in a kitchen. Through the video, Halsey and Taggart are seen singing, with Halsey in bra and panties and Taggart shirtless, with both in bed. The video ends with Halsey leaving the party in present time, Taggart follows them outside and Halsey stops and turns around to see Taggart. They both look at each other, implying they regret drifting apart.

Live performances
The Chainsmokers invited Halsey to the stage during their set at the Bonnaroo Music Festival to perform "Closer" for the first time in June 2016. Halsey and Taggart also performed the song live when they closed the show at the 2016 MTV Video Music Awards. The Chainsmokers and Halsey also performed "Closer" at the American Music Awards on November 20, 2016.

Remix
The official remix features American rapper Wiz Khalifa. It was released online on March 17, 2017.

Awards and nominations

Track listing

Charts

Weekly charts

Year-end charts

Decade-end charts

All-time charts

Certifications

|-

Release history

See also

 List of best-selling singles in Australia
 List of number-one singles of 2016 (Australia)
 List of number-one dance singles of 2016 (Australia)
 List of Ultratop 50 number-one singles of 2016
 List of Canadian Hot 100 number-one singles of 2016
 List of number-one hits of 2016 (Denmark)
 List of number-one singles of 2016 (Ireland)
 List of Dutch Top 40 number-one singles of 2016
 List of number-one singles from the 2010s (New Zealand)
 List of number-one songs in Norway
 List of Scottish number-one singles of 2017
 List of number-one singles of the 2010s (Sweden)
 List of UK Singles Chart number ones of the 2010s
 List of UK Dance Singles Chart number ones of 2016
 List of UK Dance Singles Chart number ones of 2017
 List of Billboard Hot 100 number-one singles of 2016
 List of Adult Top 40 number-one songs of the 2010s
 List of Hot 100 Airplay number-one singles of the 2010s
 List of number-one Billboard Dance/Electronic Songs
 List of number-one digital songs of 2016 (U.S.)
 List of Billboard Dance/Mix Show Airplay number-one singles of 2016
 List of Billboard Dance/Mix Show Airplay number-one singles of 2017
 List of Billboard Mainstream Top 40 number-one songs of 2016
 List of number-one Billboard Streaming Songs of 2016
 List of most liked YouTube videos
 List of most streamed songs on Spotify
 List of most streamed songs in the United Kingdom
 List of most-viewed YouTube videos

Footnotes

References

The Chainsmokers songs
Halsey (singer) songs
2016 songs
2016 singles
Songs written by Isaac Slade
Songs written by Joe King (guitarist)
Billboard Hot 100 number-one singles
Canadian Hot 100 number-one singles
Dutch Top 40 number-one singles
Irish Singles Chart number-one singles
Number-one singles in Australia
Number-one singles in Denmark
Number-one singles in New Zealand
Number-one singles in Norway
Number-one singles in Scotland
Number-one singles in Sweden
UK Singles Chart number-one singles
Ultratop 50 Singles (Flanders) number-one singles
Columbia Records singles
Electronic dance music songs
Future bass songs
Songs written by Halsey (singer)
Male–female vocal duets
Songs written by Andrew Taggart
Disruptor Records singles